Madame Maigret's Own Case is a detective novel by Belgian writer Georges Simenon, featuring his character inspector Jules Maigret. The novel was written between December 13 to December 22, 1949, in Carmel-by-the-Sea, United States. The book was published the following year by Presses de la Cité.

Translations
The book was translated into English by Helen Sebba in 1959 as Madame Maigret's Own Case. The novel was published in 1960 and in 2003 under the titles Madame Maigret's Friend and The Friend of Madame Maigret, respectively. The book was translated again in 2016 by  Howard Curtis as Madame Maigret's Friend .

The first German translation by Hansjürgen Wille and Barbara Klau was published by Kiepenheuer & Witsch in 1954. The new translation by Roswitha Plancherel was published by Diogenes Verlag in 1979.

Reception
The New York Times found the novel „more police procedure than usual," inspector Maigret acting "less like a lone wolf and more like a police officer," and a plot that was "intricate" and "hard to follow." However, good roles and lots of Parisian locations made the novel one of the better Simenons in tone and color.

Adaptations
The novel has been adapted several times:

In English
1962: The White Hat, starring Rupert Davies;

In Dutch
1965: De vriendin van mevrouw Maigret, starring Kees Brusse.

In French
1977: L'Amie de Madame Maigret, with Jean Richard in the lead role;

In Japanese
1978: Keishi to kōen no onna (警視と公園の女), starring Kinya Aikawa;

Bibliography
Maurice Piron, Michel Lemoine, L'Univers de Simenon, guide des romans et nouvelles (1931-1972) de Georges Simenon, Presses de la Cité, 1983, p. 320-321

References

External links

Maigret at trussel.com

1950 Belgian novels
Maigret novels
Novels set in France
Novels set in the 20th century